Machaela Cavanaugh (born January 17, 1979) is an American politician serving in the Nebraska Legislature from the 6th district. She is a member of the Democratic Party.

Early life and education 

Cavanaugh was born on January 17, 1979, in Washington, D.C. She is the daughter of former Nebraska state legislator and U.S. Representative John Joseph Cavanaugh III. She attended Marian High School in Omaha, Nebraska, and the University of St. Thomas, graduating with a Bachelor of Arts in sociology in 2001. She went on to graduate school at the University of Nebraska at Omaha and obtained her Masters in Public Administration (MPA) in 2008.

Career

Nebraska State Legislature

Paid family leave 

Cavanaugh describes securing paid family leave for Nebraska workers as her top legislative priority. She introduced Legislative Bill (LB) 311, which would provide up to six weeks of paid leave to care for a relative and up to twelve weeks of paid personal medical leave and paid maternity/paternity leave. The bill would be funded in a manner similar to unemployment insurance, with employers sending a portion of each worker's paycheck to the state to create a fund to pay out benefits to workers who take leave. The maximum benefit would be 66% of the state's average weekly wage. The bill was stalled as a result of opposition from other senators who were concerned about the bill's cost—up to $172 million a year according to the Legislative Fiscal Office—and described the bill as "progressive socialism" at its worst.

Creation of private lactation room in Capitol 

Cavanaugh became the first senator to breastfeed on the Capitol floor. Upon discovering that there were no designated, private spaces for women to breastfeed or pump in the Capitol building, Cavanaugh introduced LB709, which would have required a dedicated nursing station be created in for senators, staff, and visitors. All fourteen female senators in the Nebraska Legislature signed onto the bill. Though the bill languished in the Government, Military and Veterans Affairs Committee, the Nebraska Capitol Commission purchased a lactation station and set up space near the south entrance of the building.

Transgender rights 

In February 2023, state senator Kathleen Kauth introduced LB574, known as the "Let Them Grow Act", which would prohibit transgender healthcare for individuals under the age of 19. Cavanaugh, a staunch supporter of transgender rights, pledged to prevent any bill from passing by filibustering all bills. She said that “If this Legislature collectively decides that legislating hate against children is our priority, then I am going to make it painful — painful for everyone,” and that she would "burn the session to the ground over this bill". After lasting over three weeks, the filibuster ended on March 16, as an agreement was reached with the Speaker of the Legislature, John Arch.

Electoral history

Personal life
Cavanaugh and her husband, Nick Brotzel, live in Omaha and have three children. Her brother, John, an Omaha attorney, is the state senator for Nebraska's 9th legislative district.

References

External links
 Cavanaugh for Legislature
 Nebraska State Legislature page

21st-century American women politicians
21st-century American politicians
1979 births
Living people
Democratic Party Nebraska state senators
University of Nebraska alumni
Women state legislators in Nebraska
Politicians from Washington, D.C.